Canberra Avenue is a major road in Canberra, Australian Capital Territory. It is the primary link between the nation's capital and the city of Queanbeyan, New South Wales which lies on the Territory's eastern border. The route also passes historic two historic landmarks; Manuka Oval, opened in 1929 and the Church of Saint Andrew in the suburb of Forrest.

See also

References

Streets in Canberra